Abdelhamid Abuhabib (born 6 August 1989) is a Palestinian footballer currently playing for Hebron-based Shabab Al-Khaleel of the West Bank Premier League.

Early years

Abuhabeeb grew up playing football in the streets of Khan Younis from an early age. He joined his local club Shabab Khan Younis's youth team as an adolescent, following in the footsteps of his older brother Mohammed. Despite his small stature, it didn't take long before Abuhabib joined his older brother on the senior side earning his first cap in 2005.

Club career

Merkaz Balata
Like many other Gazan footballers Abuhabib went to the West Bank in search of more steady league play as the Gazan league had been victim of political turmoil. He signed with Merkaz Shabab Balata in 2009 and was able to secure an exit visa to travel to the West Bank. Upon his arrival, he was surprised to learn that he had not signed with a top tier side, but with a side playing in the second division. Abuhabib had a fantastic first season with Balata, scoring 9 goals and helping them earn promotion to the West Bank Premier League. His sublime skill caught the eye of the more established Shabab Al-Khaleel whom he signed with but voided the contract over undisclosed disputes. In 2010, Abuhabib signed a one-year deal keeping him in Nablus with Balata. 

His second season with the club would prove to be even more spectacular. In the league, Abuhabib scored 12 goals in 22 matches helping power the newly promoted side to fourth place in the 12-team league. He also turned in numerous man of the match performances in the Palestinian FA Cup scoring 8 goals in 8 games helping Balata reach the final where they lost to Hilal Al-Quds. In Abuhabib's first season in the Palestinian top flight he had 22 goals in the three competitions (12 league goals, 8 FA Cup goals, 2 Yasser Arafat Cup goals). He once again opted to extend his contract for an added year at the end of the season. He moved to Shabab Al-Khaleel at the end of the 2011–12 season.

International career
Abuhabib received his first call-up to the Olympic team in 2009 to face Tunisia. He played a pivotal role in Palestine's attempt to qualify for the 2012 Summer Olympics in London. Having been barred from traveling to Thailand by Israeli authorities for the first leg of the first round of Olympic Qualifying Abuhabib would start the second leg. He scored the only goal of the game- and the first goal in a competitive international in Palestine- in the 43rd minute on a volley from 25 meters.

Abuhabib also played in the next round against Bahrain helping Palestine win 0–1 in Manama and helping them take 1–0 halftime lead in the return leg in Palestine. Palestine would eventually go out on away goals falling just short of 3rd round of Olympic Qualifying.

Abuhabib was called up to the senior team in July 2011 to face Thailand but had to withdraw from training after suffering an abdominal injury. He made his debut as a late substitute in an October 2011 friendly against Iran. He scored his first and second goals in the 2012 AFC Challenge Cup third place playoff against the Philippines.

International goals

Senior team
Scores and results list the Palestine's goal tally first.

Olympic team
Scores and results list the Palestine's goal tally first.

Honours

National team
AFC Challenge Cup: 2014

References

1989 births
Living people
Palestinian footballers
Markaz Balata players
Shabab Al-Khalil SC players
West Bank Premier League players
Palestine international footballers
2015 AFC Asian Cup players
People from Khan Yunis Governorate
Association football midfielders
Palestine youth international footballers